Pierre-Charles-Jean-Baptiste-Silvestre de Villeneuve (31 December 1763 – 22 April 1806) was a French naval officer during the Napoleonic Wars. He was in command of the French and the Spanish fleets that were defeated by Nelson at the Battle of Trafalgar.

Early career 
Villeneuve was born in 1763 at Valensole, and joined the French Navy in 1779. He took part in naval operations in the American Revolutionary War, serving as an ensign on Marseillais, in de Grasse's fleet.

Despite his aristocratic ancestry, he sympathised with the French Revolution, dropping the nobiliary particle from his name, and was able to continue his service in the Navy when other aristocratic officers were purged. He served during several battles, and was promoted to rear admiral in 1796 as a result of this.

At the Battle of the Nile in 1798 he was in command of the rear division. His ship, was one of only two French ships of the line to escape the defeat. He was captured soon afterwards when the British took the island of Malta, but he was soon released. He was criticised for not engaging the British at the Nile, but Napoleon considered him a "lucky man" and his career was not affected. His treatment by the British was not bad, but led to him describing them as 'gobelins gras' (lit. 'greasy goblins''') in a letter to his family.

In 1804, Napoleon ordered Villeneuve, now a vice admiral stationed at Toulon, to escape from the British blockade, overcome the British fleet in the English Channel, and allow the planned invasion of Britain to take place. To draw off the British defences, Villeneuve was to sail to the West Indies, where it was planned that he would combine with the Spanish fleet and the French fleet from Brest and attack British possessions in the Caribbean, before returning across the Atlantic to destroy the British Channel squadrons and escort the Armée d'Angleterre from their camp at Boulogne to victory in England.

 Battle of Trafalgar 

 Prelude to the battle 

After an abortive expedition in January, Villeneuve finally left Toulon on 29 March 1805 with eleven ships of the line. He evaded Nelson's blockade, passed the Strait of Gibraltar on 8 April and crossed the Atlantic with Nelson's fleet in pursuit, but about a month behind owing to unfavourable winds. In the West Indies Villeneuve waited for a month at Martinique, but Admiral Ganteaume's Brest fleet did not appear. Eventually Villeneuve was pressured by French army officers into beginning the planned attack on the British, but he succeeded only in recapturing the island fort of Diamond Rock off Martinique. On 7 June he learned that Nelson had reached Antigua. On 8 June he and his fleet were able to intercept a homeward-bound convoy of 15 British merchant vessels escorted by the frigate  and the sloop or schooner . The two British warships managed to escape, but Villeneuve's fleet captured the entire convoy, valued at some five million pounds. Villeneuve then sent the prizes into Guadeloupe under the escort of the frigate . On 11 June Villeneuve set out for Europe with Nelson again in pursuit.

On 22 July Villeneuve, now with twenty ships of the line and seven frigates, passed Cape Finisterre on the northwest coast of Spain and entered the Bay of Biscay. Here he met a British fleet of fifteen ships of the line commanded by Vice Admiral Sir Robert Calder. In the ensuing Battle of Cape Finisterre, a confused action in bad visibility, the British, though outnumbered, were able to cut off and capture two Spanish ships.

For two days Villeneuve shadowed the retreating British, but did not seek a battle. Instead he sailed to A Coruña, arriving on 1 August. Here he received orders from Napoleon to sail to Brest and Boulogne as planned. Instead, perhaps believing a false report of a superior British fleet in the Bay of Biscay, and against the Spanish commanders' objections, he sailed away back to Cádiz, rendering Napoleon's planned invasion of Britain wholly impossible.

 The battle 

At Cádiz the combined French and Spanish fleets were kept under blockade by Nelson. In September, Villeneuve was ordered to sail for Naples and attack British shipping in the Mediterranean, but he was initially unwilling to move and continued in blatant disregard of superior orders.

In mid-October he learned that Napoleon was about to replace him as commanding officer with François Étienne de Rosily-Mesros and order him to Paris to account for his actions. (Napoleon had written to the Minister of Marine, "Villeneuve does not possess the strength of character to command a frigate. He lacks determination and has no moral courage.") Before his replacement could arrive, Villeneuve gave the order to sail on 18 October.

Inexperienced crews and the difficulties of getting out of Cádiz meant that it took two days to get all 34 ships out of port and into some kind of order. On 21 October 1805 Villeneuve learned of the size of the British fleet, and turned back to Cádiz, but the combined fleets were intercepted by Nelson off Cape Trafalgar. Nelson, though outnumbered, won the Battle of Trafalgar, and Villeneuve's flagship  was captured along with many other French and Spanish ships.

 Aftermath and death 

The British sent Villeneuve to England in the Euryalus but released him on parole; during this time he lived in Bishop's Waltham in Hampshire. He stayed at the Crown Inn public house and his men, who numbered 200, stayed in local houses. He was allowed to attend the funeral of Lord Nelson whilst at Bishop's Waltham. Freed in late 1805, he returned to France, where he attempted to go back into military service, but his requests were not answered.

On 22 April 1806, he was found dead at the Hôtel de la Patrie'' in Rennes with six stab wounds in the left lung and one in the heart. He had left a farewell letter to his wife. A verdict of suicide was recorded. The nature of his death ensured that this verdict was much mocked in the British press of the time and suspicions abounded that Napoleon had secretly ordered Villeneuve's murder. The question of whether Villeneuve committed suicide has been a source of contention among historians ever since.

Legacy 
His name is etched on the Arc de Triomphe.

References

Sources
 

French Navy admirals
French naval commanders of the Napoleonic Wars
French military personnel who committed suicide
1763 births
1806 deaths
Suicides by sharp instrument in France
Deaths by stabbing in France
1800s suicides
Names inscribed under the Arc de Triomphe
French military personnel of the American Revolutionary War